Bassomatic (sometimes written as Bass-O-Matic) were a British band that recorded house music in the 1990s.  A project of William Orbit, the band included vocalist Sharon Musgrave and rapper MC Inna Onestep amongst others. For the second album, singer Sindy Finn replaced Sharon Musgrave on vocals. Both albums were produced at Guerilla Studios, founded by William Orbit with Laurie Mayer and Grant Gilbert, and released by Virgin Records.

Their first album was 1990's Set the Controls for the Heart of the Bass, the title track derived from Pink Floyd's "Set the Controls for the Heart of the Sun". This album was re-released in 1997. A subsequent album, Science and Melody, was released in 1991.

Bassomatic's biggest hit single was "Fascinating Rhythm" in 1990, which reached No. 9 in the UK Singles Chart, and performed well on the UK Dance Chart.

Discography

Albums
Set the Controls for the Heart of the Bass (1990) – UK No. 57
Science and Melody (1991)

Singles

References

External links
Bassomatic at Discogs

English house music groups